Mecopisthes is a genus of dwarf spiders that was first described by Eugène Louis Simon in 1926.

Species
 it contains eighteen species:
Mecopisthes alter Thaler, 1991 – Italy
Mecopisthes crassirostris (Simon, 1884) – Portugal, France
Mecopisthes daiarum Bosmans, 1993 – Algeria
Mecopisthes jacquelinae Bosmans, 1993 – Morocco
Mecopisthes latinus Millidge, 1978 – Switzerland, Italy
Mecopisthes millidgei Wunderlich, 1995 – Italy (Sardinia)
Mecopisthes monticola Bosmans, 1993 – Algeria
Mecopisthes nasutus Wunderlich, 1995 – Greece (incl. Crete)
Mecopisthes nicaeensis (Simon, 1884) – Spain, France, Italy
Mecopisthes orientalis Tanasevitch & Fet, 1986 – Turkmenistan
Mecopisthes paludicola Bosmans, 1993 – Algeria
Mecopisthes peuceticus Caporiacco, 1951 – Italy
Mecopisthes peusi Wunderlich, 1972 – Europe, Israel
Mecopisthes pictonicus Denis, 1950 – France
Mecopisthes pumilio Wunderlich, 2008 – Switzerland
Mecopisthes rhomboidalis Gao, Zhu & Gao, 1993 – China
Mecopisthes silus (O. Pickard-Cambridge, 1873) (type) – Europe
Mecopisthes tokumotoi Oi, 1964 – Japan

See also
 List of Linyphiidae species (I–P)

References

Araneomorphae genera
Linyphiidae
Spiders of Africa
Spiders of Asia